The Masonic Building in Alexandria, Louisiana, United States, was built in 1927.  It was added to the National Register of Historic Places on January 16, 1986.

It was designed by local architect Herman J. Duncan, of Sam Stone, Jr., & Co.  It was deemed "significant for its styling on the Fourth and Johnston Street facades. The two are almost identical. Both feature an elegant piano nobile with the central three windows enclosed by pedimented frames and inscribed within round arches, The top story is encompassed by a deepened frieze with diapered brickwork in contrasting colors. The Johnston and Fourth Street facades also each feature a pair of diapered brick panels on the second level."

References

Neoclassical architecture in Louisiana
Former Masonic buildings in Louisiana
Masonic buildings completed in 1927
Buildings and structures in Alexandria, Louisiana
Clubhouses on the National Register of Historic Places in Louisiana
National Register of Historic Places in Rapides Parish, Louisiana